The South Australian Railways S class was a class of 4-4-0 steam locomotives operated by the South Australian Railways.

History

The S Class locomotives were designed as an express locomotive for the route between Murray Bridge and the border with Victoria. The first 12 were delivered by James Martin & Co in 1894, followed by a further six in 1903/04. They type was notably used to haul the Melbourne Express. The S class had 6'6" driving wheels, the largest of any Australian locomotive, to give it high speeds on low grades.

The engines were pushed out of main line service in the 1920s by 600 class locomotives and Brill railcars. They continued to serve on secondary services into the 1950s. Some locomotives even served in shunting duties despite being unsuitable due to their large wheel diameter. The last examples were retired in 1961.

S136 was set aside for preservation at Islington Railway Workshops while moves were made to preserve it. These fell through and it was scrapped.

References

External links

Railway locomotives introduced in 1894
S
4-4-0 locomotives
Broad gauge locomotives in Australia